The House of Kawānanakoa, or the Kawānanakoa Dynasty, are descendants to the throne of the Kingdom of Hawaiʻi.

Origins 
A collateral branch of the reigning House of Kalākaua (from Kauaʻi island) and descendants of chiefs of areas such as Waimea on Hawaiʻi island, the dynastic line was established by Prince David Kawānanakoa who was declared an heir to King David Kalākaua.  He was the son of High Chief David Kahalepouli Piʻikoi and  High Chiefess Victoria Kinoiki Kekaulike. Kawānanakoa was engaged to Princess Victoria Kaʻiulani on February 3, 1898, who would have become a monarch in her own right upon the death of Queen Liliʻuokalani had she not predeceased her.

David Kawānanakoa's paternal ancestry comes from a cadet branch of the Kauaʻi royal family. His paternal grandmother High Chiefess Kekahili was a half-sister of High Chief Caesar Kapaʻakea, the father of Kalākaua, both being children of the Chiefess Kamokuiki. This made her an aunt of King Kalākaua and Queen Liliʻuokalani, which makes the Kawānanakoas the closest surviving collateral relatives of the formerly reigning Kalākaua house. The said grandmother descended, besides from the ancient line of chiefs of Kauaʻi, also from the chief of Kaʻū, a great-uncle of King Kamehameha I.

However, the higher ranking ancestry of David Kawānanakoa actually is that through his mother. His maternal grandmother High Chiefess Kekaulike Kinoiki was the daughter of the last king of Kauaʻi and Niʻihau Kaumualiʻi. She was the granddaughter of Kaneoneo, who attempted to take Oʻahu back from Kahekili II in rebellion. She descended from the lines of high chiefs of Niʻihau, Koloa, Oʻahu, Kauaʻi and Maui. His maternal grandfather High Chief Kūhiō Kalanianaʻole was a descendant of several chiefly lines of the districts of the island of Hawaiʻi (such as Waimea, Kona and Hilo) and descended directly from the chief of Waimea.

The House of Kawānanakoa survives today and is believed to be heirs to the throne by a number of genealogists. Members of the family are sometimes called prince and princess, as a matter of tradition and respect of their status as aliʻi or chiefs of native Hawaiians, being lines of ancient ancestry.

The House of Kawānanakoa in contemporary Hawaiian politics is closely aligned with the Hawaii Republican Party, a political party it helped organize since the creation of the Territory of Hawaiʻi.  Its matriarch, Abigail Kawānanakoa, became a national party leader in the early years of the twentieth century.

Family tree

References

External links 
Photo Gallery:The Kawānanakoa